Mercedes Fuertes (born 28 April 1955) is a Spanish former handball player. She competed in the women's tournament at the 1992 Summer Olympics.

References

External links
 

1955 births
Living people
Spanish female handball players
Olympic handball players of Spain
Handball players at the 1992 Summer Olympics
Sportspeople from the Province of Teruel
20th-century Spanish women